Lautaro Navas (born 30 April 1996) is an Argentine professional footballer who plays as a midfielder.

Career
Navas started his career in the ranks of Atlético de Rafaela. He was an unused substitute in the club's final match of the 2016–17 Argentine Primera División against fellow relegated team Sarmiento, which preceded his professional debut arriving in Primera B Nacional on 18 February 2018 during a victory away to Ferro Carril Oeste. Navas was selected three more times in the 2017–18 campaign. Navas spent 2019–20 out on loan in Torneo Federal A with Sportivo Las Parejas. Nine total appearances followed.

In November 2020, 24-year old Navas decided to retire, due to alleged personal reasons and "lack of happiness" when playing, which led him to "hang up his boots." However, in October 2021, Navas returned to the pitch, after signing with Argentine amateur club Estudiantes Unidos de Bariloche.

Career statistics
.

References

External links

1996 births
Living people
People from Rafaela
Argentine footballers
Association football midfielders
Primera Nacional players
Torneo Federal A players
Atlético de Rafaela footballers
Sportivo Las Parejas footballers
Sportspeople from Santa Fe Province
21st-century Argentine people